The 2014 Mid Ulster District Council election took place on 22 May 2014 to elect members of Mid Ulster District Council in Northern Ireland. This was on the same day as other local elections.

Results by party

Districts summary

|- class="unsortable" align="centre"
!rowspan=2 align="left"|Ward
! % 
!Cllrs
! %
!Cllrs
! %
!Cllrs
! %
!Cllrs
! %
!Cllrs
!rowspan=2|TotalCllrs
|- class="unsortable" align="center"
!colspan=2 bgcolor=""| Sinn Féin
!colspan=2 bgcolor="" | DUP
!colspan=2 bgcolor="" | UUP
!colspan=2 bgcolor=""| SDLP
!colspan=2 bgcolor="white"| Others
|-
|align="left"|Carntogher
|bgcolor="#008800"|60.9
|bgcolor="#008800"|3
|9.0
|1
|8.7
|0
|14.8
|1
|6.6
|0
|5
|-
|align="left"|Clogher Valley
|bgcolor="#008800"|33.1
|bgcolor="#008800"|2
|28.4
|2
|25.1
|1
|13.5
|1
|0.0
|0
|6
|-
|align="left"|Cookstown
|bgcolor="#008800"|42.3
|bgcolor="#008800"|3
|12.5
|1
|23.7
|2
|12.0
|1
|9.5
|0
|7
|-
|align="left"|Dungannon
|20.3
|1
|bgcolor="#D46A4C"|20.8
|bgcolor="#D46A4C"|2
|20.3
|1
|9.1
|1
|29.5
|1
|6
|-
|align="left"|Magherafelt
|bgcolor="#008800"|29.6
|bgcolor="#008800"|2
|24.8
|1
|11.2
|1
|15.5
|1
|18.9
|0
|5
|-
|align="left"|Moyola
|bgcolor="#008800"|51.0
|bgcolor="#008800"|3
|18.5
|1
|17.0
|1
|13.6
|0
|0.0
|0
|5
|-
|align="left"|Torrent
|bgcolor="#008800"|50.0
|bgcolor="#008800"|4
|10.4
|0
|13.4
|1
|18.1
|1
|8.1
|0
|6
|- class="unsortable" class="sortbottom" style="background:#C9C9C9"
|align="left"| Total
|41.0
|18
|17.6
|8
|17.4
|7
|13.8
|6
|3.6
|1
|40
|-
|}

District results

Carntogher

Clogher Valley

Cookstown

Dungannon

Magherafelt

Moyola

Torrent 

* Incumbent

Changes during the term

† Co-options

‡ Changes of affiliation 

Last updated 25 March 2019.

Current composition: see Mid Ulster District Council.

References

2014 Northern Ireland local elections
21st century in County Londonderry
21st century in County Tyrone
Elections in County Londonderry
Elections in County Tyrone